Earnest A. Burch (September 9, 1856 – October 12, 1892) was a professional baseball outfielder who played in Major League Baseball from 1884 to 1887.

Burch was born in DeKalb County, Illinois. He played for the Cleveland Blues and Brooklyn Grays. He died in Guthrie, Oklahoma.

Sources

 Baseball Almanac

1856 births
1892 deaths
19th-century baseball players
Major League Baseball outfielders
Baseball players from Illinois
Brooklyn Grays players
Cleveland Blues (NL) players
Peoria Reds players
Washington Nationals (minor league) players
Kansas City Cowboys (minor league) players
St. Paul Saints (Northwestern League) players
St. Louis Whites players
Peoria Distillers players
People from DeKalb County, Illinois